Memories of a Beautiful Disaster is the debut studio album of American rock musician James Durbin, released on November 21, 2011 through Wind-up Records.

Recording
The name of the album was announced in late September 2011 by Durbin via a Twitter post, and the cover was revealed on October 7. The album was released on November 21, 2011 on Wind-up Records. Howard Benson was the producer.

Guitarist Mick Mars is a guest on one song from the album. Other musicians involved with the album include songwriter Marti Frederiksen, Swedish band Hardcore Superstar and Sixx:A.M. members James Michael, and DJ Ashba.

Singles
Two singles were initially released from the album. "Love Me Bad" was leaked online on October 19, 2011, but was officially released on Ryan Seacrest's radio show on November 2. The second single, "Stand Up", was originally written for Official Gameday Music of the NFL Vol. 1 and was released to rock radio stations.

Track listing
The track listing for the album was revealed on October 19, 2011.

Reception

Allmusic gave Memories of a Beautiful Disaster a rating of three out of five stars, and said that while the album was "much more pop than rock," in contrast to Durbin's American Idol performances, it "does deliver the vocal goods here on material that should appeal to his AmIdol fan base."

Chart performance
The album debuted on the Billboard 200 chart at number 36 with first-week sales of 28,000.  The album has sold 123,000 copies in the US as of January 2017.

Weekly charts

Year-end charts

References

2011 albums
James Durbin (singer) albums